Linux Target Image Builder (LTIB) is an open-source project based on RPM, menuconfig and Perl. LTIB is similar in concept to Buildroot and other Linux file system builders. LTIB can develop and deploy board support packages (BSP) for various target platforms. One can develop a Linux image for his or her specific target. The project was initially sponsored by Freescale Semiconductor and later moved to Savannah.

See also 
 Yocto Project
 Buildroot
 uClinux-dist
 OpenEmbedded
 OpenWRT

References

External links 
 PTXdist
 Denx ELDK

Embedded Linux